Savannosiphon is a genus of flowering plants in the family Iridaceae, first described as a new species in 1980. It contains only one known species, Savannosiphon euryphylla, native to tropical Africa (Zaire, Tanzania, Malawi, Mozambique, Zimbabwe).

The genus name, derived from the word savanna and the Greek word siphon (meaning "tube") alludes to its habitat and the structure of its perianth tube.

References

Iridaceae
Monotypic Iridaceae genera
Flora of Africa